Action Against Trafficking in Persons and Smuggling of Migrants in Nigeria (A-TIPSOM Nigeria) is an 11th European Development Fund project which is implemented in Nigeria by the International and Ibero-American Foundation for Administration and Public Policies (FIIAPP). 

A-TIPSOM is a program designed to reduce trafficking in persons (TIP) and smuggling of migrants (SOM) at the national and regional level with specific emphasis on women and children in Nigeria. A-TIPSOM is anchored by FIIAPP.

The team leader of A-TIPSOM is Rafael Molina.

History
A-TIPSOM was founded in 2018 through an agreement between the European Union Delegation (EUD) and the Government of Nigeria, and is funded by the European Union (EU).

Mission and objectives 
The A-TIPSOM project is developed to:
 Improve governance of the migration sector in Nigeria, with a specific focus on the fight against TIP and SOM; 
 Enhance prevention of TIP and SOM in key states of origin and of transit. 
 Improve protection, return, and reintegration of victims of trafficking and of smuggling from Europe  
 Enhance identification, investigation, and prosecution of traffickers and smugglers 
 Promote more effective cooperation at the national, regional, and international levels in fighting TIP and SOM.

Technical advisors 
A-TIPSOM engages the following technical advisors and experts for their project implementation:
 Policy: Belo Omotosho
 Prevention: Joseph Sanwo
 Protection: Nurat Lawal
 Prosecution: Sani Dantuni
 Partnership: Ugo Ogbunude
 Community and Communication: Joseph Osuigwe

A-TIPSOM is in partnership with various non-governmental and governmental organizations to engage in various activities which include the rescue of victims of human trafficking, anti-human trafficking campaigns, and training. A-TIPSOM's programs operate in areas known as the five P's: policy, prevention, protection, partnership and prosecution.

References

Human trafficking in Nigeria
Human rights abuses in Nigeria